

Early life and education 
Meir Javedanfar was born in Tehran to a family from the city of Isfahan. He studied at the Ettefegh and Abrishami Jewish day schools in Tehran. He also studied for one year at the Shahid Mohammad Baqir Sadr Muslim day school, situated in his neighborhood of Gisha.  

Eight months after his bar mitzvah in Tehran, in March 1987, Meir and his family moved to the U.K as Jewish refugees from Iran. Between 1992 and 1995 he studied Business and Management studies B.Sc. at Salford University.

1995-1996 Meir studied the MA International Relations and Strategic Studies course at Lancaster University. His MA thesis was entitled “Israeli Motivations for Military Intervention in Lebanon: 1982 to Date (1996).” His thesis conclusion recommended Israel to withdraw from Lebanon to bolster its own security and to reduce tensions with its northern neighbor. Incidentally, this happened four years later in May 2000 when Israel withdrew all its military forces which were occupying southern Lebanon.

1997-1998 Meir studied the MSc Manufacturing and Management Information Systems course at the University of West of England. His MSc thesis was based on the analysis of the Information Technology systems of the Czech civilian aircraft manufacturer Let Kunovice. Consequently, Meir lived for 3 months in the Czech city of Uherské Hradiště,  in the Czeck region of Southern Moravia.  

In May 2022 Meir completed his PhD at Haifa University. His thesis was entitled: “Serving Regime or National Interests? Security Decision-Making in Iran during the Reign of Muhammad Riza Shah Pahlavi Concerning Threats Posed by Iraq and the Soviet Union, 1941-1979.”

Career 
In 2004 Meir Javedanfar moved permanently to Israel from the U.K and in 2005 he established the Middle East Economic and Political Analysis (MEEPAS) company. He ran the company until 2019.  From 2008 to date Meir has been advising a E.U government on Iranian affairs.

Since 2005, Meir has published many articles on Iran and Israel in publications such as The Guardian, Foreign Affairs, Foreign Policy, The Diplomat, The National Interest, The Global Policy Journal, The Atlantic, Al Monitor and more.

Since 2005 he has been a TV contributor to BBC Persian, since 2014 to I24 news and since 2017 to the Persian language Iran International TV station.

Books 
Javedanfar, Meir and Melman, Yossi. The Nuclear Sphinx of Tehran – Mahmoud Ahmadinejad and The State of Iran, Carroll & Graf, March 1, 2007. Endorsed by Israeli President Shimon Peres and Defense Minister Ehud Barak and translated into English, Hebrew, Dutch and Polish.

Javedanfar, Meir. “The Islamic Republic of Iran: The Ministry of Information and Security (VAVAK)” chapter in book series PSI Handbook of Global Security and Intelligence: National Approaches, Praeger, April 30, 2008

Teaching 
Since 2011 Meir Javedanfar has been teaching various Iran related courses at Reichman University, formerly known as the Interdisciplinary Center, Herzliya (IDC).

In 2021 he also started teaching the Political Economy of the Middle East course at the same university.

He has appeared as a guest lecturer in more than 20 universities and colleges in the U.S., U.K, Israel, Argentina, Ecuador, Peru, Uruguay and Chile.  

Since 2022, Meir Javedanfar has been a nonresident fellow at the Middle East Institute at Washington D.C.

Languages 
Persian, Hebrew, English, Spanish (studied at Calii, Colombia) and Portuguese (studied at São Salvador da Bahia).

References 

Living people
Iranian emigrants to Israel
Iranian Jews
Israeli Mizrahi Jews
Israeli radio journalists
Year of birth missing (living people)